Sabah State Mosque is the state mosque of Sabah, located at Sembulan roundabout between Jalan Mat Salleh and Jalan Tunku Abdul Rahman in  Kota Kinabalu, Sabah, Malaysia.

History
Construction began in 1970 and was completed in 1975. The architectural design was by Arkitek Jurubina Bertiga, led by Dato Baharuddin Abu Kassim. The mosque was officially opened on 28 June 1977 by the sixth Yang di-Pertuan Agong, Sultan Yahya Petra of Kelantan.

Sabah State Mausoleum
The Sabah State Mausoleum is situated near the mosque. Tun Fuad Stephens, Chief Minister of Sabah (1976) who died in the Double Six Tragedy plane crash on 6 June 1976, became the first person laid to rest at this mausoleum.

Notable burials
 Tun Fuad Stephens (Donald Stephens) – Sabah state Yang di-Pertua Negeri (Governor) (1973–1975) and Chief Ministers of Sabah (1963–1964, 1973–1976) (died 1976)
 Tun Mohd Hamdan Abdullah – Sabah state Yang di-Pertua Negeri (Governor) (1975–1977) (died 1977)
 Tun Pengiran Ahmad Raffae – Sabah state Yang di-Pertua Negeri (Governor) (1965–1973) (died 1995)
 Tun Mohammad Said Keruak – Sabah state Yang di-Pertua Negeri (Governor) (1987–1994) (died 1995)
 Tun Mohamad Adnan Robert – Sabah state Yang di-Pertua Negeri (Governor) (1979–1987) (died 2003)
 Tun Sakaran Dandai – Sabah state Yang di-Pertua Negeri (Governor) (1995–2002) (died 2021)

Gallery

See also
 Islam in Malaysia

External links

 

 
1977 establishments in Malaysia
Mosques in Sabah
Mausoleums in Malaysia
Mosques completed in 1975
Mosque buildings with domes